The 2015 Asian Women's Youth Handball Championship is the 6th edition of the Asian Women's Youth Handball Championship organised by Handball Federation of India under the aegis of Asian Handball Federation. The championship was held from 27 August - 3 September 2015 at the Indira Gandhi Indoor Stadium in New Delhi, India.

Draw

Group A

Group B

5th–7th placement matches

5th/6th-place match

Knockout stage

Knockout round table

Semifinal matches

Bronze-medal match

Gold-medal match

Final standings

External links
Asian Handball Federation

International handball competitions hosted by India
Asia
2015 in Indian sport
Asian Handball Championships